Midwest Millions is an American scratchcard game that began on September 7, 2007, in Iowa and Kansas, administered by the Multi-State Lottery Association. It originally became available in Kansas at the State Fair in Hutchinson and then throughout Kansas on September 13. It was the US's first multi-jurisdictional scratch game since the Powerball scratch ticket in the early 2000s. Both $500,000 prizes were won on tickets bought in Iowa, although one of the winners was from Nebraska. In 2007, it was announced that other Midwestern lotteries may be added in a future edition.

A total of 1.2 million tickets were offered, split evenly between Iowa and Kansas. The game's biggest prize, $500,000 cash, was won in both second-chance drawings. The first drawing was held in January 2008 in Topeka, Kansas; Because of the success of the first series, another version was announced to start in April 2008.

References

External links
Iowa Lottery
Kansas Lottery
MUSL website

Economy of the Midwestern United States
Lottery games in the United States
Scratchcard games
Hutchinson, Kansas
Economy of Kansas
Economy of Iowa